H.N. Gambrill was a US merchant schooner involved in slave trade activities. The ship was captured on 3 November 1853 by  during her mission in the African Squadron. H.N. Gambrill was Constitutions last prize.

History 
On 24 October 1853 the British warship  encountered H.N. Gambrill off Cabinda. The British were suspicious and inspected the ship but released it later on. Crane later encountered  and provided its commanding officer Commodore Isaac Mayo with information about H.N Gambrill. H.N. Gambrills master tried to avoid the inspection by falsely raising the British flag and claimed that he was a legitimate trader working for Hatton and Cookson in Liverpool. Constitutions crew later found the ship to be outfitted for slave-transportation. Lieutenant DeCamp was ordered to take H.N. Gambrill back to New York, and to deliver the ship to the proper authorities

References

Captured ships
1853 ships
Maritime incidents in 1853